is a Japanese luger. He competed at the 1998 Winter Olympics and the 2002 Winter Olympics.

References

External links
 

1979 births
Living people
Japanese male lugers
Olympic lugers of Japan
Lugers at the 1998 Winter Olympics
Lugers at the 2002 Winter Olympics
People from Nagano (city)